Nosratabad-e Bayeh (also Romanized as Noşratābād-e Bāyeh; also known as Noşratābād-e Bābeh, Bāya, and Bāyeh) is a village in Dashtabi-ye Sharqi Rural District, Dashtabi District, Buin Zahra County, Qazvin Province, Iran. At the 2006 census, its population was 169, in 37 families.

References 

Populated places in Buin Zahra County